Eupithecia spilosata is a moth in the family Geometridae. It is found in Honduras and Bolivia.

References

Moths described in 1863
spilosata
Moths of Central America
Moths of South America